This is a list of episodes for Season 11 of Late Night with Conan O'Brien, which aired from September 3, 2003, to August 13, 2004.

Series overview

Season 11

References

Episodes (season 11)